Sachigo Lake 1 is a First Nations reserve in northwestern Ontario. It is the main reserve of the Sachigo Lake First Nation.

References

Oji-Cree reserves in Ontario
Communities in Kenora District